Geocharax is a genus of southern crayfish in the family Parastacidae. There are two described species in Geocharax, both found in Australia.

Geocharax falcata is endemic to the North Grampians in Victoria. This species can be found in the headwaters of the Glenelg River and also throughout the north of the Grampians National Park in southwest Victoria.

Geocharax tasmanicus is endemic to Victoria and Tasmania. Within Tasmania, this species is restricted to the far northwest, occurring between Rocky Cape and Temma on the Tasmanian mainland and also on islands of the Hunter group and King Island. In Victoria, it is restricted to the Otway Region.

The IUCN conservation status of Geocharax falcata is "VU", vulnerable. The species has a limited geographic range, and faces a high risk of endangerment in the medium term. The IUCN status of Geocharax tasmanicus is "LC", least concern, with no immediate threat to survival. The IUCN status for both species was assessed in 2010.

References

Parastacidae
Decapod genera